Oliver Wnuk (born 28 January 1976) is a German actor. He is best known for his performance as Ulf Steinke in the TV series Stromberg.

Selected filmography

References

External links 

1976 births
Living people
German male film actors